Nitrourea, is an explosive compound synthesized by the nitration of urea or by way of a dehydration reaction of urea nitrate.

References 

Explosive chemicals
Nitroamines
Ureas